Denyatino is a rural locality (a selo) and the administrative center of Denyatinskoye Rural Settlement, Melenkovsky District, Vladimir Oblast, Russia. The population was 643 as of 2010. There are 7 streets.

Geography 
Denyatino is located 20 km north of Melenki (the district's administrative centre) by road. Aleksandrino is the nearest rural locality.

References 

Rural localities in Melenkovsky District
Melenkovsky Uyezd